Raffaello Alliegro (born 30 May 1964) is a former Italian male long-distance runner who competed at three editions of the IAAF World Cross Country Championships at senior level (1988, 1989, 1990). He won one national championships at senior level (1991 half marathon).

References

External links
 

1964 births
Living people
Italian male long-distance runners
Italian male cross country runners